Don Patterson (born December 10, 1950) is a former American football coach. He served as the head football coach at Western Illinois University in Macomb, Illinois from 1999 to 2009, when he resigned due to health problems related to treatment for cancer.  Patterson was the 18th football coach at the school.  His record at Western Illinois was 63–47. He spent his final two years of coaching as assistant head coach and quarterbacks coach of the Connecticut Huskies. Patterson announced his retirement on January 8, 2016 after 37 years of college coaching.

Head coaching record

Notes

References

1950 births
Living people
Buffalo Bulls football coaches
Iowa Hawkeyes football coaches
North Texas Mean Green football coaches
UConn Huskies football coaches
Western Illinois Leathernecks football coaches
People from Corsicana, Texas
Educators from Texas